Virginio Livraghi is an Italian comic strip artist and illustrator who worked for the British nursery comics Playhour and Once Upon a Time.

Books Illustrated by Virginio Livraghi in English
 Alice in Wonderland, retold by Jane Carruth (London, Odhams, 1963)
 Curly the Pig, by Maria Pia Pezzi (New York, Golden Press, 1967)
 Brer Rabbit, by Barbara Hayes (Vero Beach, Fla., Rourke Enterprises, 1984)

References

Italian comics artists
Italian illustrators
Living people
Year of birth missing (living people)